Crossocheilus burmanicus is a tropical freshwater species of fish in the family Cyprinidae, that is closely related to minnows and carps. It lives in the streams and rivers of mountains that are located in several Asian countries, specifically India, Myanmar, and China.

References 

Fish of Thailand
Fish described in 1936
Crossocheilus